Kenderova Buttress (‘Rid Kenderova’ \'rid ken-'de-ro-va\ is the ice-covered ridge rising to 2101 m in the west foothills of Bruce Plateau on Graham Coast in Graham Land, Antarctica.  It has steep and partly ice-free southwest and northwest slopes, and surmounts Comrie Glacier to the northeast and northwest and its tributary Pollard Glacier to the southwest.

The buttress is named after Rositsa Kenderova, geomorphologist at St. Kliment Ohridski base in 2004/05 and subsequent seasons.

Location
British mapping in 1971.

Maps
British Antarctic Territory. Scale 1:200000 topographic map. DOS 610 Series, Sheet W 65 64. Directorate of Overseas Surveys, Tolworth, UK, 1971.
 Antarctic Digital Database (ADD). Scale 1:250000 topographic map of Antarctica. Scientific Committee on Antarctic Research (SCAR). Since 1993, regularly upgraded and updated.

Notes

References
 Bulgarian Antarctic Gazetteer. Antarctic Place-names Commission. (details in Bulgarian, basic data in English)
 Kenderova Buttress. SCAR Composite Gazetteer of Antarctica

External links
 Kenderova Buttress. Copernix satellite image

Mountains of Graham Land
Bulgaria and the Antarctic
Graham Coast